Visible Secret 2 is a 2002 Hong Kong horror comedy film directed by Abe Kwong and stars Eason Chan and Cherrie Ying.

Plot
A man with the ability to see ghosts begins to suspect that his wife may be possessed.

Cast
Eason Chan
Cherrie Ying
Roger Kwok
Jo Kuk
Joe Cheung
Law Lan
Sheila Chan
Sum Sum

Release
Visible Secret 2 was released in Hong Kong in 2002. In the Philippines, the film was released by Media Asia Films on October 15, 2003.

See also
Visible Secret (2001)

References

External links

2002 films
Hong Kong horror films
Hong Kong supernatural horror films
2000s Hong Kong films